The following outline is provided as an overview of and topical guide to American politics:

American politics – the politics of the United States.

Features of American politics

Branches of Government 
 Legislative Branch
 Executive Branch
 Judicial Branch

Levels of Government
 National government
 State governments
 Local governments

Elections

 Contested elections in American history
 Electoral College
 First-past-the-post voting
 Gerrymandering
 Nonpartisan blanket primary
 Ranked-choice voting
 Runoff voting
 Suffrage

History of American politics 

 History of the United States Congress

Party Systems
 First Party System
 Second Party System
 Third Party System
 Fourth Party System
 Fifth Party System
 Sixth Party System

Notable events
 Impeachment of Andrew Johnson
 Direct election of Senators
 Watergate scandal
 Republican Revolution of '94
 Impeachment of Bill Clinton
 Impeachment of Donald Trump
Second impeachment of Donald Trump

General American politics concepts 
 Political spectrum

American politics organizations

Political Parties

List of political parties in the United States

The two major national parties are:
 Democratic Party
 Republican Party

Documents central to American politics 
 United States Declaration of Independence
 United States Constitution
 The Federalist Papers
 United States Bill of Rights

Positions in American politics 
 President of the United States
 Vice President of the United States
 Speaker of the United States House of Representatives
 Chief Justice of the United States

Persons influential in American politics 
 Founding Fathers of the United States
 List of Presidents

References

Further reading
 Greenstein, Fred I. et al. Evolution of the modern presidency : a bibliographical survey (1977) bibliography and annotation of 2500 scholarly books and articles. online4

External links 

 

American politics
American politics
Politics of the United States